Aktjubocheilus is a genus of oncocerid nautiloids from the Upper Devonian (M Famenian) included in the Acleistoceratidae, a family characterized by depressed, or rarely compressed, exogastric brevicones and cyrtocones.

References

 The Paleobiology Database Aktjubocheilus entry accessed 8/21/12
 Sepkoski J.J. List of Cephalopod Genera
 Walter c. Sweet, 1964  Nautiloidea - Oncocerida. Treatise on Invertebrate Paleontology, Part K, 1964.

Prehistoric nautiloid genera